The 2006 Golden Globes (Portugal) were held on 25 May 2006.

Winners
Cinema:
Best Film: Alice, with Marco Martins
 nominated: A Cara que Mereces, with Miguel Gomes
 nominated: Adriana, with Margarida Gil
 nominated: Odete, with João Pedro Rodrigues
Best Actor: Nuno Lopes, in Alice
 nominated: Bruno Bravo, in Adriana
 nominated: Joaquim de Almeida, in Um Tiro no Escuro
 nominated: Luís Miguel Cintra, in O Quinto Império
Best Actress: Ana Moreira, in Adriana
nominated: Ana Cristina Oliveira, in Odete
nominated: Beatriz Batarda, in Alice
nominated: Isabel Ruth, in Adriana
Merit and Excellency Award: Raul Solnado

References

Golden Globes (Portugal)
Golden Globes (Portugal)
Golden Globes (Portugal)
Golden Globes (Portugal)
Golden Globes
Golden Globes